The Scorpion silent pistol is a special purpose suppressor integrated weapon which was designed by STC Delta solely for special operation forces. It was introduced in 2012 along with other new side arms.

Features
For the development the best features of similar type weapons were taken into consideration. The primary distinction between the Scorpion and regular semi-automatic pistols is the integrated noise dampening or suppressor system which is further extended by attachable silencers. Unlike similar models it has a large magazine capacity while being slightly longer and heavier. It uses 9 mm Kurz Browning cartridges and fires in semi-automatic mode.

Use
Because of its designated purpose the Scorpion is intended to be used only by military or other services selected units and special forces. It is not for civilian use.

See also 
 PB (pistol)

References

External links 
 Pistols and Pneumatic Rifle / პისტოლეტები და "სპორტული პნევმატური შაშხანა" (video, in Georgian)

Silenced firearms
Pistols